Rosser Park may refer to:

 Rosser Park, also previously known as Rosser Park Botanic Gardens, now known as Gold Coast Regional Botanic Gardens
 Roser Park Historic District, a United States historic district located in St. Petersburg, Florida